Mr. Country Rock is an album by the country singer Billy "Crash" Craddock. It was released in 1973 on ABC Records. The album included several hits including, "'Till The Water Stops Runnin'" and "Sweet Magnolia Blossom".

Track listing
"'Till the Water Stops Runnin'"
"Honey Love"
"She's Mine"
"I'm in Love Again"
"Everybody Likes It"
"Slippin' and Slidin'"
"Holy Cow"
"Sweet Magnolia Blossom"
"Peggy Sue"
"Whole Lotta Shakin' Goin On"

References

Billy "Crash" Craddock albums
1973 albums
Albums produced by Ron Chancey
ABC Records albums